The President of Ireland's Cup, also known simply as the President's Cup, is an association football super cup featuring clubs from the Republic of Ireland football league system. It is a one-off match between the winners of the previous season's League of Ireland Premier Division and the FAI Cup, and similarly to the FA Community Shield in England, functions both as a domestic Super cup and a unofficial opener to the football season in Ireland. Because it is organised by the Football Association of Ireland, it is sometimes misleadingly referred to as the FAI President's Cup. However the president in the title refers to the President of Ireland and not the president of the FAI. The FAI has previously organised similar competitions, the Top Four Cup and the FAI Super Cup. A similarly named and formatted competition, the LFA President's Cup was organised by the Leinster Football Association.

History

The President of Ireland's Cup was introduced in 2014 and the inaugural match featured the 2013 League of Ireland Premier Division champions, St Patrick's Athletic, and the 2013 FAI Cup winners, Sligo Rovers. On 25 February 2014 the cup itself was officially unveiled with a ceremony at Áras an Uachtaráin hosted by the President of Ireland, Michael D. Higgins. The president has previously served as president of Galway United and is a well known football supporter who regularly attends League of Ireland games. Also at the ceremony were Liam Buckley and Ger O'Brien, the manager and captain of St Patrick's Athletic and Ian Baraclough and Gavin Peers, the manager and captain of Sligo Rovers. President Higgins subsequently attended the inaugural final at Richmond Park on 2 March 2014, which was won 1–0 by St Patrick's Athletic with Keith Fahey scoring the winner.

List of finals

List of winners by club

See also
Top Four Cup
FAI Super Cup
LFA President's Cup

References

 
Ireland
Association football cup competitions in the Republic of Ireland
FAI cup competitions
2014 establishments in Ireland